The men's triple jump event at the 1984 Summer Olympics in Los Angeles, California had an entry list of 28 competitors, with two qualifying groups (28 jumpers) before the final (12) took place on August 4, 1984. The maximum number of athletes per nation had been set at 3 since the 1930 Olympic Congress. The top twelve and ties, and all those reaching 16.60 metres advanced to the final. The event was won by Al Joyner of the United States, the nation's first title in the men's long jump since 1904 and fourth overall. Mike Conley Sr., also an American, took silver. Keith Connor's bronze was Great Britain's first medal in the event since 1908. The Soviet boycott broke that nation's four-Games gold medal and eight-Games podium streaks.

Background

This was the 20th appearance of the event, which is one of 12 athletics events to have been held at every Summer Olympics. The only returning finalists from the 1980 Games were fourth-place finisher Keith Connor of Great Britain and eighth-place finisher Ken Lorraway of Australia; the Soviet jumpers were not present due to the boycott while the two men who felt they had been wronged by Soviet judging in 1980, João Carlos de Oliveira and Ian Campbell, had both suffered career-ending injuries shortly after the Moscow Games. The inaugural world champion, Zdzisław Hoffmann of Poland, was also absent due to the boycott. Mike Conley Sr. of the United States was the favorite.

Cameroon, the People's Republic of China, Mali, Paraguay, and Togo each made their first appearance in the event. The United States competed for the 19th time, having missed only the boycotted 1980 Games.

Competition format

The competition used the two-round format introduced in 1936. In the qualifying round, each jumper received three attempts to reach the qualifying distance of 16.60 metres; if fewer than 12 men did so, the top 12 (including all those tied) would advance. In the final round, each athlete had three jumps; the top eight received an additional three jumps, with the best of the six to count.

Records

Prior to the competition, the existing world and Olympic records were as follows.

No new world and Olympic records were set during this competition.

Schedule

All times are Pacific Daylight Time (UTC-7)

Results

Qualifying

Final

McCalla and Taiwo were tied for eighth at 16.64 metres after three jumps, so both received the additional three jumps.

See also
 1982 Men's European Championships Triple Jump (Athens)
 1983 Men's World Championships Triple Jump (Helsinki)
 1984 Men's Friendship Games Triple Jump (Moscow)
 1986 Men's European Championships Triple Jump (Stuttgart)
 1987 Men's World Championships Triple Jump (Rome)

References

External links
  Official Report
  Results

T
Triple jump at the Olympics
Men's events at the 1984 Summer Olympics